Thurston Lake is a lake adjacent to the southeast side of the much larger Clear Lake. in Northern California.

In the past, volcanic deposits formed a ridge separating Thurston Lake from Clear Lake. The lake is notably turbid, the result of clayey runoff from nearby Manning Flat.

References

Lakes of California
Lakes of Lake County, California